Kanachak (Kanaçak) is a rural locality (a selo) in Turochaksky District, the Altai Republic, Russia. The population was 106 as of 2016. There are 5 streets.

Geography 
Kanachak is located 47 km northwest of Turochak (the district's administrative centre) by road. Ozero-Kureyevo is the nearest rural locality.

References 

Rural localities in Turochaksky District